Blue Zoo Animation Studio is a British animation studio known for producing children's television series, commercials and, short films. Founded in 2000 by Oli Hyatt, Adam Shaw, and Tom Box from Bournemouth University, the studio has gone on to win numerous BAFTAs and in 2021 won two Daytime Emmy awards. They have also previously won the Best Places to Work in TV survey by Broadcast and Best Companies Group.

Some of the more well-known children's shows the studio has produced are Alphablocks, Numberblocks, Digby Dragon, Miffy's Adventures Big and Small, The Adventures of Paddington, and It's Pony.

The company operates from a studio in Fitzrovia, London, where they have a team of over 200 artists. It later expanded to a second studio, adjacent to its main studio, thats 'dedicated to episodic 2D animation.' In August 2021, it was announced that they would be opening a new hub in Brighton, initially partnering with Plug-In Media on a new 2D pre-school action comedy series.

In 2021, the company became the first major animation studio in the world to achieve B Corp certification.

List of long form productions 
 The Story Makers (2002–2004, Blue Cow segments)
 Tikkabilla (2002–2007, Animation Segments/Sami's World)
Those Scurvy Rascals (2005)
 Doodle Do (2006, Sandworms segments)
 Kerwhizz (2008-2011)
Stitch Up Showdown (2009)
 Alphablocks (2010–2022)
 Olive the Ostrich (2011)
 Tree Fu Tom (2012–2016)
 Q Pootle 5 (2013–2014)
 Miffy's Adventures Big and Small (2015–2017)
Go Jetters (2015)
 Digby Dragon (2016)
Mac and Izzy (2016)
Numberblocks (2017–2021)
 It's Pony (2020–2022)
 The Adventures of Paddington (2020–present)
Millie and Lou (2021)
Pip and Posy (2021)
Superworm (2021)
Big Tree City (2022–present)
Colourblocks (2022–present)

List of awards and accolades 

|-
! scope="row" | 2006
| Children's BAFTA
| Animation
| Those Scurvy Rascals
| 
|-
! scope="row" | 2008
| Children's BAFTA
| Short Form
| Stitch Up Showdown
| 
|-
! scope="row" | 2009
| Children's BAFTA
| Short Form
| My Favourite Bedtime Story
| 
|-
! scope="row" | 2009
| Children's BAFTA
| Breakthrough Talent
| Adam Shaw
| 
|-
! scope="row" | 2010
| Children's BAFTA
| Learning - Primary
| Alphablocks
| 
|-
! scope="row" | 2010
| Children's BAFTA
| Short Form
| My Favourite Bedtime Story
| 
|-
! scope="row" | 2012
| Children's BAFTA
| Pre-School Animation
| Tree Fu Tom
| 
|-
! scope="row" | 2012
| Children's BAFTA
| Independent Production Company
| Blue Zoo Animation Studio
| 
|-
! scope="row" | 2014
| Children's BAFTA
| Short Form
| Gumball Song
| 
|-
! scope="row" | 2014
| Children's BAFTA
| Independent Production Company
| Blue Zoo Animation Studio
| 
|-
! scope="row" | 2016
| Children's BAFTA
| Independent Production Company
| Blue Zoo Animation Studio
| 
|-
! scope="row" | 2017
| Children's BAFTA
| Learning
| Numberblocks
| 
|-
! scope="row" | 2017
| Children's BAFTA
| Independent Production Company
| Blue Zoo Animation Studio
| 
|-
! scope="row" | 2018
| BAFTA Films
| Short Film
| Mamoon
| 
|-
! scope="row" | 2019
| Children's BAFTA
| Pre-School Animation
| Digby Dragon
| 
|-
! scope="row" | 2019
| Children's BAFTA
| Pre-School Animation
| Numberblocks
| 
|-
! scope="row" | 2020
| Annies
| Best TV/Media - Preschool
| The Adventures of Paddington
| 
|-
! scope="row" | 2020
| Annies
| Best Voice Acting - TV/Media
| It's Pony
| 
|-
! scope="row" | 2020
| Annies
| Best Production Design - TV/Media
|The Adventures of Paddington
| 
|-
! scope="row" | 2016
| PromaxBDA UK
| Best Direct Response Promo
| Bitesize
| 
|-
! scope="row" | 2015
| PromaxBDA UK
| Best Channel Identity
| Nick Jr Rebrand
| 
|-
! scope="row" | 2015
| PromaxBDA UK
| Best Sponsorship Package
| LEGO Star Wars Rebels
| 
|-
! scope="row" | 2021
| Emmy Award
| Outstanding Pre-School Children's Animated Series
| The Adventures of Paddington
| 
|-
! scope="row" | 2021
| Emmy Award
| Outstanding Writing for a Pre-School Animated Program
| The Adventures of Paddington
| 
|-
! scope="row" | 2021
| Emmy Award
| Outstanding Directing for a Pre-School Animated Program
| The Adventures of Paddington
|

References

External links
 Blue-Zoo's website
 Blue-Zoo's Vimeo page

Mass media companies established in 1879
Blue Zoo Animation Studio
1879 establishments in England
B Lab-certified corporations
Television production companies of the United Kingdom
Mass media companies based in London